Stillwater High School may refer to:

Stillwater High School (Oklahoma) — Stillwater, Oklahoma
Stillwater Area High School — Stillwater, Minnesota
Stillwater High School (New York) — Stillwater, New York